Cotroni is an Anglicization of the Italian surname Cotrone. Notable people with the surname include:

Cotroni crime family, an Italian-Canadian crime family
Vincenzo Cotroni (1911–1984), Italian-Canadian mobster
Frank Cotroni (1931–2004), Italian-Canadian mobster

References

Italian-language surnames
Toponymic surnames